Paris By Night 46: 15th Anniversary Celebration is a Paris By Night program produced by Thúy Nga that was taped in 1998 at Terrace Theater in Long Beach Convention and Entertainment Center, Long Beach, California. This show was dedicated to celebrate Paris By Night's fifteenth-anniversary from 1983 to 1998 (hence the theme, "15th Anniversary Celebration"). The hosts for the show were the two emcees: Nguyễn Ngọc Ngạn and Nguyễn Cao Kỳ Duyên. This show was released as a 3-tape VHS near the end of 1998 (note: this was the first Paris By Night to release in a three-tape VHS, rather than a two-tape VHS like the previous editions).

SONG LIST

1. Đời Em Như Cát Khô (Lê Xuân Trường) / THIÊN KIM

2. Nghi Ngờ (Song Kim) / THẾ SƠN, MỸ HUYỀN

3. Mưa Hồng (Trịnh Công Sơn) / KHÁNH LY

4. Holiday (Curtis Hudson, Lisa Stevens - lời Việt: Duy Quang) / LYNDA TRANG ĐÀI

5. Đóa Hoa Đôi (thơ: Ngọc Nhĩ, nhạc: Hữu Xuân) / TRÚC LAM, TRÚC LINH

6. Mùa Thu Xa Em (Ngô Thụy Miên) / ELVIS PHƯƠNG, ÁI VÂN

7. Tình Yêu Tân Thế Kỷ (Song Ngọc) / DON HỒ

8. Chị Tôi (thơ: Đoàn Thị Tảo, nhạc: Trọng Đài) / THÙY DƯƠNG

9. Hài kịch: "Thiên Duyên Tiền Định" (Nguyễn Ngọc Ngạn) / TRANG THANH LAN, HỒNG ĐÀO, QUANG MINH

10. Tàn Nỗi Mong Chờ (lời Việt: Lê Xuân Trường) / NHƯ QUỲNH

11. Lạnh Trọn Đêm Mưa (Huỳnh Anh) / HOÀI NAM

12. Cà Phê Một Mình (Ngọc Lễ) / NGUYỄN HƯNG, BẢO NGỌC

13. Lady Marmalade (Bob Crewe, Kenny Nolan - lời Việt: Lê Xuân Trường) / CHÂU NGỌC, PHƯƠNG VY

14. Tâm Sự Gửi Về Đâu? (thơ: Lê Minh Ngọc, nhạc: Phạm Duy) / ELVIS PHƯƠNG

15. Nhạc kịch: "Thị Mầu Lên Chùa" (Phạm Duy) / Giọng: ÁI VÂN, THÁI HIỀN - Diễn: ÁI VÂN, BẢO HÂN

16. Xe Đạp Ơi! (Ngọc Lễ) / THẾ SƠN

17. Yesterday (Lennon-McCartney - lời Việt: Lê Hựu Hà, Nguyễn Trung Cang) / DUY QUANG, TUẤN NGỌC, THÁI THẢO, THÁI HIỀN

18. Đêm Vắng Anh (lời Việt: Lê Xuân Trường) / LƯU BÍCH

19. Mưa Trên Phố Huế (Minh Kỳ, Tôn Nữ Thụy Khương) / HOÀNG LAN

20. Nhạc kịch: "West Side Story" - Tonight, America (Leonard Bernstein, Stephen Sondheim) / BẢO HÂN, TOMMY NGÔ

21. Đừng Lừa Dối Nhau (Y Vân) / Ý LAN

22. Con Gái Bây Giờ (Quốc Hùng) / NGUYỄN HƯNG

23. Chúc Mừng (Lam Phương): Trình diễn áo dài, designed by Erik Lu / LYNDA TRANG ĐÀI, BẢO HÂN, MỸ HUYỀN, HOÀNG LAN, CHÂU NGỌC, NHƯ QUỲNH, THIÊN KIM, TRÚC LAM, TRÚC LINH, BẢO NGỌC, PHƯƠNG VY

Paris by Night